Ayub Said-Khasanovich Batsuyev (born 9 February 1997) is a Russian football player who plays for FC Veles Moscow as central midfielder.

Club career
He made his professional debut in the Russian Professional Football League for FC Terek-2 Grozny on 24 May 2016 in a game against PFC Spartak Nalchik.

He has been on the roster of FC Akhmat Grozny since 2013, and, after scoring 3 goals in the first 2 games of the 2017–18 youth championship, made his debut in the Russian Premier League for the club on 29 July 2017 in a game against FC Dynamo Moscow.

On 16 January 2019, he joined FC Chayka Peschanokopskoye on loan until the end of the 2018–19 season.

On 29 January 2020, he signed with Kazakhstan Premier League club FC Taraz.

Career statistics

Club

References

External links
 

1997 births
People from Argun, Chechen Republic
Sportspeople from Chechnya
Living people
Russian footballers
Association football midfielders
FC Akhmat Grozny players
FC Chayka Peschanokopskoye players
FC Inter Cherkessk players
FC Taraz players
FC Veles Moscow players
Russian Premier League players
Russian First League players
Russian Second League players
Kazakhstan Premier League players
Russian expatriate footballers
Expatriate footballers in Kazakhstan
Russian expatriate sportspeople in Kazakhstan
Expatriate footballers in Latvia
Russian expatriate sportspeople in Latvia